Gniewczyna Łańcucka is a village in the administrative district of Gmina Tryńcza, within Przeworsk County, Subcarpathian Voivodeship, in south-eastern Poland.

The village has a population of 2,203.

History

In May 1942 Polish citizens of Gniewczyna Łęczycka and Gniewczyna Tryniecka detained and for several days tortured and raped the remaining Jewish population of the village, before handing them over to the Germans for execution. However, some local Poles also tried to shield the Jews.

References

Villages in Przeworsk County
Holocaust locations in Poland
Jewish Polish history